Tanosawa Tameike is an earthfill dam located in Aomori Prefecture in Japan. The dam is used for irrigation. The catchment area of the dam is 0.8 km2. The dam impounds about 10  ha of land when full and can store 1174 thousand cubic meters of water. The construction of the dam was started on 1932 and completed in 1945.

References

Dams in Aomori Prefecture
1945 establishments in Japan